A Hungarian Fairy Tale (original title: Hol volt, hol nem volt) is a 1987 Hungarian film directed by Gyula Gazdag.

Plot 
Andris is a child living in Budapest. He is conceived when his mother Maria is attracted to a mysterious stranger during a performance of The Magic Flute. The stranger disappears after the conception, and as a result Andris does not know his father. The law states that a boy should have his father's name, even if the father is unknown, to avoid the taint of illegitimacy. When Maria tries to register Andris with the child custody department, Andris is given the name of a fictitious father. She enters on Andris' birth certificate the name of the bureaucrat she is dealing with, Antal Orban.

Maria dies when she is hit on the head by a falling brick, an accident resulting from being in the wrong place at the wrong time, leaving Andris suddenly motherless. He then goes off in search of his nonexistent father. Along the way he meets and is helped by The Girl, the young nurse who delivered him, and who is alone like Andris. Meanwhile, the kindly Orban becomes tired of the tyrannical bureaucracy, and decides to destroy the files of children he has helped to legitimize by giving them fictitious fathers. He then sets out to find Andris. Andris and The Girl finally meet Orban, and they form their own family.

They meet scouts being trained as instruments of the state, and the scouts pursue Andris, Orban and The Girl. The three of them climb onto the back of a stone eagle, which takes off in flight.

Cast 
Dávid Vermes - Andris
František Husák - Antal Orban
Mária Varga - Maria
Eszter Csákányi - The Girl

Accolades 
The film won the following awards:
Fantafestival 1988 - Best Actress (Mária Varga)
Locarno International Film Festival 1987 - Bronze Leopard (Dávid Vermes) (Special Grand Prize)
Salerno International Film Festival 1989 - Grand Prix (Gyula Gazdag)
Sitges Film Festival 1987 - Best Film (Gyula Gazdag)

External links 
 

1987 films
1987 fantasy films
Films about orphans
Films set in Budapest
Hungarian black-and-white films
Hungarian fantasy films